Sa Bang-ji is a 1988 South Korean film directed by Song Kyung-shik. The film was inspired by the real life Sa Bangji, an intersex person of the Joseon Dynasty.

Plot 
Sa Bangji is a hermaphrodite, born to a hardened criminal and mentally disturbed woman. Taken in at a monastery, Sa Bang-ji meets and falls in love with a grieving young widow, Lee So-sa, but she betrays him when their relationship is discovered by the elders in her family. Sa Bang-ji manages to escape and meets a shaman priestess named Myo-hwa, with whom he plots to take revenge. After Myo-hwa is killed, Sa Bang-ji and So-sa are reunited, but then Sa Bang-Ji is captured and killed and So-sa commits suicide.

Cast 
 Lee Hye-young
 Bang Hee
 Kwak Jung-hee
 Park Am
 Lee Kyoung-hee
 Jo Seong-geun
 Cho Ju-mi
 Han Young-su
 Lee Young-gil

References

External links 
 
 

1988 films
1980s Korean-language films
South Korean LGBT-related films
Films about intersex
1988 LGBT-related films